Gafil Swami (born 22 July 1953, Aligarh) is an Indian poet of Hindi-language from Aligarh, Uttar Pradesh. He is known for his poetry on corruption.

Biography 
He was born in Lalpur village of Aligarh district in Uttar Pradesh. His father was late Dheeri Singh and mother is Smt. Dhaura Devi. In 2012, a collection of his poetry called "Jai Ho Bhrashtachar Ki"  was published by Nirupama Publication, Meerut.

Reportedly, by Dainik Jagran, In March 2013, he was awarded by Shabd Pravah Sahitya Manch, Ujjain.

Published work 
 Jai Ho Bhrashtachar Ki, 2012

See also

 List of Indian poets
 List of people from Uttar Pradesh
 List of Hindi-language poets

References

Indian male poets
20th-century Indian poets
1953 births
People from Aligarh
Living people
Poets from Uttar Pradesh
20th-century Indian male writers